Sportverein Wörgl is an Austrian association football club from Wörgl. The team currently competes in the Austrian Regional League Tirol, the third tier of Austrian football.

History
Founded in 1952, they played in the Tiroler League until 1992 when they clinched promotion to the third tier Austrian Regionalliga. In 1998 they were promoted to the 2. Liga after beating VSE Sankt Pölten on penalties. However, they were demoted to the 4th tier Landesliga in 2005 after losing their licence.

Honours
Austrian Regionalliga West: 1
 1998

Players

Current squad

References

External links
Official site
Profile at ÖFB

Football clubs in Austria
Association football clubs established in 1952
1952 establishments in Austria